The Crime Museum is a collection of criminal memorabilia kept at New Scotland Yard, headquarters of the Metropolitan Police Service in London, England. Known as the Black Museum until the early 21st century, the museum came into existence at Scotland Yard sometime in 1874, arising out of the collection of prisoners' property gathered as a result of the Forfeiture Act 1870 and intended as an aid to the police in their study of crime and criminals. Initially unofficial, it had become an official if private museum by 1875, with a police inspector and a police constable assigned to official duty there. Not open to the public, it was used as a teaching collection for police recruits and was only ever accessible by those involved in legal matters, royals and other VIPs.

Now sited in the basement of the Curtis Green Building (the present New Scotland Yard), the museum remains closed to the public but can be visited by officers of the Metropolitan Police and any of the country's police forces by prior appointment.

History

Origins
In his 1993 book The Black Museum: New Scotland Yard, the Museum's then-curator Bill Waddell asserted that its origins lay in an 1869 Act giving the police authority to either destroy items used in the commission of a crime or retain them for instructional purposes, when previous to that Act they had been retained by the police until reclaimed by their owners. No such Act was passed in 1869 and this misapprehension seems to originate in a misdated mention of the Forfeiture Act 1870 in an 1877 newspaper report on the Museum :

The 1870 Act abolished forfeiture of property for felony and treason—instead it vested that property's "custody and management" in an "administrator", who would then return it at the end of the prisoner's sentence.

The Black Museum was conceived in 1874 by Percy George Neame, a serving inspector. The first exhibits for display were clothing and items belonging to Jane Clouson, 17, murdered in Eltham who at that time had collected together a number of items, with the intention of giving police officers practical instruction on how to detect and prevent crime. 
By the latter part of 1874, official authority was given for a crime museum to be opened. Neame, with the help of a P.C. Randall, gathered together sufficient material of both old and new cases—initially pertaining to exhibits found in the possession of burglars and thieves—to enable a museum to be subsequently opened. The actual date in 1875 when the Black Museum opened is not known, but the permanent appointment of Neame and Randall to duty in the Prisoners Property Store on 12 April suggests that the museum may have come into being in the latter part of that year.

There was no official opening of the museum, whose first two years saw a steady increase in visitors, particularly by CID officers being instructed in the museum as part of their training, keeping it in constant use. However, no record of visitors was kept until 6 October 1877, when a group of dignitaries were shown round the collection by Commissioner Sir Edmund Henderson, KCB and Assistant Commissioners Lt. Col. Labalmondiere and Capt. Harris. They were the first entries in a visitors' book which ran until 1894 and—though not all visitors were asked to sign it—it contains many notable figures from the period. One reporter from The Observer newspaper was refused admittance by Inspector Neame and on 8 April 1877 that journalist coined the name 'Black Museum' for the collection.

1890–present
In 1890 the museum moved with the Metropolitan Police Office to new premises at the other end of Whitehall, on the newly constructed Thames Embankment. The building, constructed by Norman Shaw RA, and made of granite quarried by convicts on Dartmoor, was called New Scotland Yard. A set of rooms in the basement housed the museum and, although there was no Curator as such, PC Randall was responsible for keeping the place tidy, adding to exhibits, vetting applications for visits and arranging dates for them. Inspector Percy Neame retired on 31 December 1901. In June 1902 he committed suicide "by blowing his brains out" when Chief Inspector Arthur Fair and another officer were at his front door, calling in respect of a "few things in his accounts which they could not understand with reference to money siezed at gaming houses". The museum was closed during both World War I and II, and in 1967, with the move of New Scotland Yard to new premises in Victoria Street, S.W.1, the museum was housed in rooms on the second floor, which underwent several renovations.

During the refurbishment and extension of the Curtis Green Building and New Scotland Yard's move into it, a major exhibition of artefacts from the museum, The Crime Museum Uncovered, was held at the Museum of London from 9 October 2015 to 10 April 2016. Following the exhibition the Museum reopened in 2018 in a "dark and dramatic" room in the basement of the Building designed by Allford Hall Monaghan Morris in collaboration with engineering consultancy Arup.

Though the 2015–2016 exhibition was the only time a large number of exhibits have been displayed to the public, individual objects have been loaned to exhibitions at other museums in 2019–2020. This included objects from Leatherslade Farm in a Great Train Robbery exhibition at the Postal Museum and a cigarette lighter with a hidden compartment from the Krogers in a GCHQ exhibition at the Science Museum, whilst exhibits from the trial of Roger Casement have been on loan to Kerry County Museum since 2016.

Collections
These include historic collections and more recent artefacts, including a substantial collection of melee weapons (some overt, some concealed, all of which have been used in murders or serious assaults in London), shotguns disguised as umbrellas and numerous walking-stick swords. The museum also contains a selection of hangman's nooses, including that used to perform the UK's last-ever execution, and death masks made for criminals executed at Newgate Prison and acquired in 1902 on the prison's closure.

There are also displays from famous cases which include Charlie Peace and letters allegedly written by Jack the Ripper. The infamous From Hell letter is not part of the collection. The more recent exhibits on display include the ricin-filled pellet that killed Bulgarian dissident Georgi Markov in 1978, a model of the possible umbrella that fired the pellet, the fake De Beers diamond from the Millennium Dome heist and Dennis Nilsen's actual stove and bathtub.

Other items no longer on public display include items that once belonged to Charles Black, the most prolific counterfeiter in the Western Hemisphere. These include a set of printing plates, a remarkable series of forged banknotes, and a cunningly hollowed-out kitchen door once used to conceal them.

Cases on display

The eponymous pieces of evidence from the February 1918 "Badge and Button Murder", also known as the Eltham Common murder
Udham Singh, an Indian revolutionary who shot and killed Michael O'Dwyer, the former Lieutenant Governor of the Punjab in British India.
Ruth Ellis, the last woman to be executed in the United Kingdom, after being convicted of the murder of her lover, David Blakely.
John Reginald Halliday Christie, a notorious English serial killer active in the 1940s and early 1950s.
The Stratton Brothers, the first men to be convicted in Great Britain for murder based on fingerprint evidence
John George Haigh, an English serial killer, active between 1944 and 1949

Neville Heath, an English killer who was responsible for the murders of at least two young women, and who was executed in London in 1946
Dennis Nilsen, a serial killer and necrophiliac, also known as the Muswell Hill Murderer and the Kindly Killer, who committed the murders of 15 young men in London
Thomas Neill Cream, also known as the Lambeth Poisoner, a Scottish-born serial killer (his poisoner’s kit is on display)
Death of Keith Blakelock in the Broadwater Farm housing estate in 1985 (his uniform is displayed)
A cast of the hole drilled into the vault wall during the Hatton Garden safe deposit burglary is on display. During the long weekend of Easter Bank Holiday in April 2015, four thieves burgled deposit boxes with a value up to £200 million
The trunk from the Charing Cross Trunk Murder

In other media
In 1951 British commercial radio producer Harry Alan Towers produced a radio series hosted by Orson Welles called The Black Museum, inspired by the catalogue of items on display. Each week, the programme featured an item from the museum and a dramatization of the story surrounding the object to the macabre delight of audiences.  Often mistakenly cited as a BBC production, Towers commercially syndicated the programme throughout the English-speaking world.  The American radio writer Wyllis Cooper also wrote and directed a similar anthology for NBC that ran at the same time in the U. S. called Whitehall 1212, for the telephone number of Scotland Yard. The program debuted on 18 November 1951, and was hosted by Chief Superintendent John Davidson, curator of the Black Museum.

There is a fictional Black Museum, inspired by the actual one, inside the Grand Hall of Justice in the Judge Dredd comic strip.
A fictional version of the Black Museum is often referred to in the Dylan Dog comic series and, in some stories, exhibits are stolen from the museum.
In the 1944 film The Lodger, Inspector Warwick (George Sanders) gives a tour of the museum to Kitty Langley (Merle Oberon).
A 1958 horror film called Horrors of the Black Museum references the Black Museum in a story of a crime writer (played by Michael Gough) who commits grisly murders in order to write articles and books about them for public consumption.
 The fourth series of Charlie Brooker's Black Mirror has an episode called  "Black Museum".
 Tony Parsons wrote about the Black Museum in his books about detective Max Wolfe.

References

Cited works and further reading

External links
New Scotland Yard's Black Museum tour on DVD (archived)
Friends' statement (archived)
Metropolitan Police's Crime Museum

Museums established in 1874
History of the Metropolitan Police
Law enforcement museums in London
Museums in the City of Westminster
1874 establishments in England
Private collections in the United Kingdom